Michael Theurer (born 12 January 1967) is a German politician of the Free Democratic Party (FDP) who has been serving as a member of the Bundestag from the state of Baden-Württemberg since 2017. From 2009 until 2017, he was a Member of the European Parliament.

In addition to his parliamentary work, Theurer has been serving as Parliamentary State Secretary in the Federal Ministry of Transport and Digital Infrastructure in the coalition government of Chancellor Olaf Scholz since 2021. In this capacity, he is also the Federal Commissioner for Rail Transport.

Early life and career 
After graduating from the Martin-Gerbert-Gymnasium in 1986, Theurer served in the Bundeswehr in Calw until 1987. From 1988 to 1990 he worked as a volunteer for the Black Forest Messenger in Oberndorf am Neckar. He then worked for a few months as local editor of this newspaper in Schramberg before beginning his studies in economics at the University of Tübingen in October 1990. He completed this in November 1995 as a graduate economist.

Political career 
From 1995 to August 2009 Theurer served as Lord Mayor of the city of Horb am Neckar and from 2001 to 2009 as member of the State Parliament of Baden-Württemberg.

From 2009 until 2017, Theurer was a member of the European Parliament. Throughout his time in parliament, he served on the Committee on Budgetary Control. In addition, he was a member of the Committee on Regional Development (2009-2012), the Committee on Industry, Research and Energy (2011-2012) and the Committee on Economic and Monetary Affairs (2014-2017).

Theurer became a member of the Bundestag in the 2017 German federal election. From 2017 until 2021, he served as deputy chairman of his party's parliamentary group, under the leadership of chairman Christian Lindner. 
 
Following the 2021 state elections in Baden-Württemberg, Theurer led his party's delegation in the negotiations with Minister-President Winfried Kretschmann's Alliance '90/Greens on a potential coalition government.

In the negotiations to form a so-called traffic light coalition of the Social Democrats (SPD), the Green Party and the FDP following the 2021 federal elections, Theurer led his party's delegation in the working group on economic policy; his co-chairs from the other parties are Carsten Schneider and Cem Özdemir.

Other activities

Corporate boards 
 KfW, Ex-Officio Member of the Board of Supervisory Directors

Non-profit organizations 
 Baden-Badener Unternehmer-Gespräche (BBUG), Member of the Board of Trustees (since 2020)
 Agora Energiewende, Member of the Council 
 Reinhold Maier Foundation, Member of the Board of Trustees
 Theodor Heuss Foundation, Member of the Board of Trustees

References

External links 

  
 Bundestag biography 
 

 

1967 births
Living people
Members of the Bundestag for Baden-Württemberg
Members of the Bundestag 2021–2025
Members of the Bundestag 2017–2021
MEPs for Germany 2009–2014
MEPs for Germany 2014–2019
People from Tübingen
Members of the Bundestag for the Free Democratic Party (Germany)